A perverse incentive is an incentive that has an unintended and undesirable result that is contrary to the intentions of its designers. The cobra effect is the most direct kind of perverse incentive, typically because the incentive unintentionally rewards people for making the issue worse. The term is used to illustrate how incorrect stimulation in economics and politics can cause unintended consequences.

Examples of perverse incentives

The original cobra effect 

The term cobra effect was coined by economist Horst Siebert based on an anecdote of an occurrence in India during British rule. The British government, concerned about the number of venomous cobras in Delhi, offered a bounty for every dead cobra. Initially, this was a successful strategy; large numbers of snakes were killed for the reward. Eventually, however, enterprising people began to breed cobras for the income. When the government became aware of this, the reward program was scrapped. When cobra breeders set their now-worthless snakes free, the wild cobra population further increased. This story is often cited as an example of Goodhart's Law.

Other examples 
 The Great Hanoi Rat Massacre occurred in 1902, in Hanoi, Vietnam (then known as French Indochina), when under French colonial rule, the colonial government created a bounty program that paid a reward for each rat killed. To collect the bounty, people would need to provide the severed tail of a rat. Colonial officials, however, began noticing rats in Hanoi with no tails. The Vietnamese rat catchers would capture rats, sever their tails, then release them back into the sewers so that they could produce more rats.
 In building the first transcontinental railroad in the 1860s, the United States Congress agreed to pay the builders per mile of track laid. As a result, Thomas C. Durant of Union Pacific Railroad lengthened a section of the route forming a bow shape unnecessarily adding miles of track.
 The Duplessis Orphans – Between 1945 and 1960, the federal Canadian government paid orphanages 70 cents per day, per orphan, and paid psychiatric hospitals $2.25 per day, per patient. Allegedly, up to 20,000 orphaned children were falsely certified as mentally ill so that the province of Quebec could receive the larger payment.
 The 20th-century paleontologist G. H. R. von Koenigswald used to pay Javanese locals for each fragment of hominin skull that they produced. He later discovered that the people had been breaking up whole skulls into smaller pieces to maximize their payments.
 In 2002 British officials in Afghanistan offered Afghan poppy farmers $700 an acre in return for destroying their poppy crops.  This ignited a poppy-growing frenzy among Afghan farmers who sought to plant as many poppies as they could in order to collect payouts from the cash-for-poppies program. Some farmers harvested the sap before destroying the plants, getting paid twice for the same crop.
 Bangkok police used tartan armbands as a badge of shame for minor infractions. However, the badges were treated as collectibles by those offending officers forced to wear them. Since 2007, in order to avoid the perverse incentive, the police department has been using armbands with the cute Hello Kitty cartoon character.
 Renewable Heat Incentive scandal (commonly referred to as the Cash for Ash scandal) Introduced by the devolved government in Northern Ireland, the Renewable Heat Incentive (RHI) was a 20-year scheme intended to encourage businesses to reduce energy usage and promote switching to green sources. However, the subsidy for the renewable energy was greater than its cost, which allowed businesses to make a profit by switching to green sources and then increasing their energy use rather than reducing it. In some cases, an income was obtained simply by heating empty buildings. The political fall-out caused the Northern Ireland Executive to collapse in 2017. It was not re-convened until 2020.
 In late 2004, Fannie Mae was subject to an investigation regarding its accounting practices. It was discovered that, by providing company executives with bonuses for reporting higher earnings, executives at Fannie Mae and other large corporations were encouraged to artificially inflate earnings statements and make decisions targeting short-term gains at the expense of long-term profitability.
 Experiencing an issue with feral pigs, the U.S. Army post of Fort Benning in Georgia offered hunters a $40-bounty for every pigtail turned in. Predictably, however, people began to buy pigtails from butchers and slaughterhouses at wholesale prices then resold the tails to the Army at the higher bounty price.
 Wells Fargo account fraud scandalIntending to increase the number of accounts sold, Wells Fargo in 2016 introduced and imposed overly ambitious sales goals to be met by their employees. As a result, facing the threat of losing their careers if these quotas were not met, some employees began to open large numbers of unauthorized accounts.
 In 2005 the UN Intergovernmental Panel on Climate Change began an incentive scheme to cut down on greenhouse gases. Companies disposing of polluting gases were rewarded with carbon credits, which could eventually get converted into cash. The program set prices according to how serious the damage the pollutant could do to the environment was and attributed one of the highest bounties for destroying HFC-23, a byproduct of a common coolant, HCFC-22. As a result, companies began to produce more of this coolant in order to destroy more of the byproduct waste gas, and collect millions of dollars in credits. This increased production also caused the price of the refrigerant to decrease significantly, motivating refrigeration companies to continue using it, despite the adverse environmental effects. In 2013, credits for the destruction of HFC-23 were suspended in the European Union.
 Around 2010, online retailer Vitaly Borker found that customer posts elsewhere on the Internet about negative experiences with his eyeglass-sale website, DecorMyEyes, actually drove more traffic to it since the sheer volume of links pushed the site to the top of Google searches. He thus made a point of responding to customer complaints about the poor quality of the merchandise they received and/or misfilled orders rudely, with insults, threats of violence and other harassment. Borker continued these practices under different names throughout the next decade despite serving two separate sentences in U.S. federal prison over charges arising from them.
 In the 2000s, Canada negotiated a "Safe Third Country Agreement" with the U.S. under which applicants for political asylum could only apply in the first of the two countries they reached, in order to discourage asylum shopping. Among the provisions was one that denied anyone entering Canada at an official port of entry from requesting asylum there, in theory limiting asylum applications to either those filed by refugees in camps abroad or those who could legally travel to Canada and do so at an immigration office. In the late 2010s, some migrants began entering Canada irregularly, between official border crossings, at places like Roxham Road between New York and Quebec, since once they were in Canada, they were allowed to file applications with the full range of appeals available to them, a process that could take years. Canada wound up processing thousands more applications for asylum than it had planned to.
 Hacktoberfest is an October-long celebration to promote contributions to the free and open-source software communities. In 2020, participants were encouraged to submit four or more pull requests to any public free or open-source (FOS) repository, with a free "Hacktoberfest 2020" T-shirt for the first 75,000 participants to do so. The free T-shirts caused thousands of frivolous pull requests on FOS projects. A large volume of pull requests made by users amounted to counterproductive changes to code, including: changing project names from "My Project" to "My Awesome Project"; changing bullet points to dashes; and in some cases, even breaking working code.
 The United States Endangered Species Act of 1973 imposes development restrictions on landowners who find endangered species on their property. While this policy has some positive effects for wildlife, it also encourages preemptive habitat destruction (draining swamps or cutting down trees that might host valuable species) by landowners who fear losing the lucrative development-friendliness of their land because of the presence of an endangered species. In some cases, endangered species may even be deliberately killed to avoid discovery. This same perverse incentive has also been observed in other countries, including Canada and various European countries.
 Funding fire departments by the number of fire calls that are made is intended to reward fire departments that do the most work. However, it may discourage them from fire-prevention activities, leading to an increase in actual fires.
 Paying medical professionals and reimbursing insured patients for treatment but not prevention encourages medical conditions to be ignored until treatment is required. Moreover, paying only for treatment effectively discourages prevention (which would improve quality of life for the patient but would also reduce the demand for future treatments). Payment for treatment also generates a perverse incentive for unnecessary treatments that could be harmfulfor example, in the form of side effects of drugs and surgery. These side effects themselves can then trigger a demand for further treatments.
 Under the American Medicare program, doctors are reimbursed at a higher rate if they administer more expensive medications to treat a condition. This creates an incentive for the physician to prescribe a more expensive drug when a less expensive one might do.
 The "welfare trap" theory describes perverse incentives that occur when money earned through part-time or minimum-wage employment results in a reduction in state benefits that would have been greater than the amount earned, thereby creating a barrier to low-income workers re-entering the workforce. According to this theory, underlying factors include a full tax exemption for public assistance while employment income is taxed; a pattern of welfare paying more per dependent child (while employers are prohibited from discriminating in this manner, and their workers often must purchase daycare); or loss of welfare eligibility for the working poor ending other means-tested benefits (public medical, dental, or prescription drug plans; subsidised housing; legal aid), which are expensive to replace at full market rates. If the withdrawal of means-tested benefits that comes with entering low-paid work causes there to be no significant increase in total income or even a net loss, then this gives a powerful disincentive to take on such work. The welfare trap theory's accuracy is disputed, and some studies have shown the poor individuals who are given money tend to spend it on necessities, and continue working.
 A container-deposit legislation provides for a refundable deposit to be placed on beverage containers. When returned to an authorized redemption center the deposit is partly or fully refunded to the redeemer. Intended to encourage recycling and curb litter, these programs may result in containers, already bound for recycling, to be illegally collected from curbside bins or dumpsters. Containers may be diverted to nearby regions with higher redemption values, as famously depicted in the Seinfeld episode "The Bottle Deposit".
 The United Kingdom's listed building regulations are intended to protect historically important buildings by requiring owners to seek permission before making changes to buildings that have been listed. In 2017, the owners of an unlisted historic building in Bristol destroyed a 400-year-old ceiling the day before a scheduled visit by listings officers, allegedly to prevent the building from being listed, which could have limited future development.
 Bulgarian doctor Ivan Manukov performed an operation on a healthy person to place two stents in his heart in order to receive remuneration for the operations.
Gun buyback programs are carried out by governments to reduce the number of guns in circulation, by purchasing firearms from citizens at a flat rate (and then destroying them). Some residents of areas with gun buyback programs have 3D printed large numbers of crude parts that met the minimum legal definition of a firearm, for the purpose of immediately turning them in for the cash payout.
 As an incentive to preserve historical homes, government started program to designate old homes as historical properties, which prevents further sales or alteration of the property. However, in many cases, the offered compensation was significantly less than fair market price of the property and/or land. In the months after, incidence of fire increased in the districts that rolled out this program, resulting in more destruction of historical homes.
 The FASTER Act of 2021 in the U.S. was intended to aid those with an allergy to sesame in avoiding the substance by ensuring foods which contain it are labelled, however the stringent requirements around preventing cross-contamination made it simpler and less expensive for many companies to instead add sesame to their products and label it as an ingredient, decreasing the number of sesame-free products available and creating the risk of an allergic reaction occurring from previously safe foods.

In literature 
In his autobiography, Mark Twain says that his wife, Olivia Langdon Clemens, had a similar experience:

See also

References

Further reading
 Chiacchia, Ken (2017 July 12). "Perverse Incentives? How Economics (Mis-)shaped Academic Science." HPC Wire.
 Myers, Norman, and Jennifer Kent (1998). Perverse SubsidiesTax $ Undercutting our Economies and Environments Alike. Winnipeg, Manitoba: International Institute for Sustainable Development.
 Rothschild, Daniel M., and Emily Hamilton [2010] (2020). "Perverse Incentives of Economic 'Stimulus'," Mercatus on Policy Series 66. ; .
 Schuyt, Kirsten (2005). "Perverse Policy Incentives." pp. 78–83 in Forest Restoration in Landscapes, edited by S. Mansourian, Daniel Vallauri, and N. Dudley. New York: Springer. .
 Sizer, N. (2000). Perverse Habits, the G8 and Subsidies the Harm Forests and Economies. Washington, DC: World Resources Institute.
 
 Stephan, Paula (2012). "Perverse incentives." Nature 484(2012):29–31. .
 "Perverse Incentives for South African AIDS Patients." Center for Global Development (2006 April 8).

Subsidies
Literature
Conflict of interest
Political corruption
Mechanism design